Lu-Yu Tea Culture Institute, previously known as Lu Yu Tea Art Center, provides education in tea arts (including tea marketing, design of tea ware, and tea brewing techniques) and promotes the drinking of tea. It offers certifications in Tea Studies, such as for "Tea Master" (陸羽泡茶師). The institute was founded in Taipei, Taiwan, in 1980. It now has schools in Beijing, Chengdu and Shanghai. It is named for Lu Yu, the 8th-century "sage of tea". While most students are Chinese speakers, others come from Japan, South Korea and there are also classes and tea studies certification in English.

See also
 Tenfu Tea College
 Tatung Institute of Commerce and Technology
 History of tea in China
 Tea culture
 Tenfu Tea Museum

References

 Joe Wicentowski (2000)pg10 Lu Yu Tea Art Center

External links
 Official website

Organizations based in Taipei
Buildings and structures in Taipei
Culture in Taipei
Schools in Taipei
Schools in Beijing
Education in Chengdu
Schools in Shanghai
Tea culture
Chinese tea
Chinese tea ceremony schools
1980 establishments in Taiwan